The inauguration of the president of the Republic of the Philippines is a ceremony marking the commencement of the six-year term of a president of the Philippines, who is both head of state and head of government. The inauguration is performed on June 30, as mandated by the 1987 Constitution. Under the older 1935 Constitution, the date was December 30, which is also Rizal Day; the last inauguration held on the older date was Ferdinand Marcos' second one on December 30, 1969. The most recent public presidential inauguration ceremony was that of President Bongbong Marcos, who began his six-year term in office on Thursday, June 30, 2022.

The only inauguration element mandated by the Constitution is that the president-elect takes the oath, or makes an affirmation, before that person can "enter on the execution" of the office of the presidency. Over the years, various unofficial traditions have arisen that have expanded the inauguration from a simple oath-taking ceremony to a day-long event, including parades, speeches, and balls.

When a new president takes over mid-term due to the death, resignation, or deposition of another president, the oath of office is administered as soon as possible, and due to the sudden nature of such an event, formal public celebrations are not held.

Inauguration rites

The ceremony since 1992 traditionally begins with the president-elect fetching the incumbent in Malacañang Palace on the morning of June 30. At the Palace's State Entrance, the president-elect will wait for the incumbent to descend the Grand Staircase. Upon meeting at the foot of the staircase, the president-elect would greet the incumbent.

Both travel to the Quirino Grandstand aboard any of the presidential cars. Following protocol, the outgoing president takes the back right-hand seat of the vehicle, while the president-elect is seated behind the chauffeur. At the Grandstand's parade grounds, the outgoing president will be welcomed with arrival honors, and then shake hands with the president-elect. The outgoing president conducts a final troop review and is presented to the public before departing the Grandstand aboard their own private vehicle. Corazon Aquino broke the custom of leaving the Grandstand immediately, choosing instead to stay until the end of Fidel Ramos's inaugural speech. Ramos also attended the oath-taking of Joseph Estrada and the inaugural ceremonies.

The inauguration proper then begins with the singing of the national anthem. An ecumenical invocation follows, led by leaders of the different major religions of the Philippines, followed by a patriotic musical piece by a musical ensemble. Afterward, the president of the Senate of the Philippines reads the Joint Resolution of the Joint Congressional Board of Canvassers proclaiming the newly elected president and vice president. Since the Third Republic, the vice-president-elect is sworn in before the president-elect to immediately secure the line of succession. During his inauguration, President Manuel L. Quezon took the oath of office first to mark a "new start".

As mandated by the Constitution, the president-elect then takes the oath of office at exactly 12:00 PST (GMT+8); in 2010, President-elect Aquino did not await noon, he instead took his oath moments after Vice-President-elect Binay finished doing so. The oath is customarily administered by the Chief Justice of the Supreme Court of the Philippines, but that is not required. Due to political differences, Benigno Aquino III instead had then-Associate Justice Conchita Carpio-Morales administer the oath instead of then-Chief Justice Renato Corona. A 21-gun salute is then immediately fired, followed by four ruffles and flourishes and the Presidential Anthem, We Say Mabuhay, is played in honor of the new president, followed by the presidential honors music Marangal na Parangal (Glorious Honors).

The new president then delivers an inaugural address. Previous inaugurations also saw a full military and civil parade in the same manner as the Independence Day celebrations on 12 June (similar to the US Inaugural Parades) right after the address. From the late 1940s to the late 1960s, similar parades were also held on Rizal Day on 30 December as well and to ring in the New Year's celebrations that would start the day after.

The new president then returns to Malacañang Palace to formally take possession of the residence. This formal entry is symbolized by the president ascending the Grand Staircase and proceeding to the Ceremonial Hall. Juan Luna's painting, The Blood Compact, is currently displayed at the top of the Staircase. The president then inducts the new Cabinet on the same day and holds its first meeting immediately after.

In the evening, an inaugural reception is held for other officials and foreign dignitaries who wish to call on the new president. The customary banquets of either a vin d'honneur or an inaugural ball were abolished in an effort to revert to the pre-martial law practice of simpler official receptions. The last inaugural ball was held in 1981 for Ferdinand Marcos' third inauguration, which was also the last time the Rigodon de Honor (a Hispanic dance analogous to a court dance) was performed; it was again danced on the Independence Day celebrations of 2009. The president concludes the ceremonies with a toast, as a gesture of amity towards states that maintain diplomatic ties with the Philippines.

Date
The new president is to be inaugurated at noon of June 30 as currently mandated by the 1987 Constitution, but past ceremonies were held on different dates. The first president, Emilio Aguinaldo, was inaugurated on January 23, 1899, while presidents under the 1935 Constitution were inaugurated at noon of Rizal Day (December 30). Only two presidents under the 1935 Constitution were not inaugurated on December 30, namely Sergio Osmeña and Manuel Roxas. Ferdinand Marcos changed the inauguration date to the present June 30, while his successors Corazon Aquino and Gloria Macapagal Arroyo were inaugurated on February 25, 1986, and January 20, 2001, respectively, Aquino after the People Power Revolution and Arroyo after the Second EDSA Revolution.

Location

Nine inaugurations have been held at the Quirino Grandstand in the Luneta, namely Quirino (1949), Magsaysay (1953), Garcia (December 1957), Macapagal (1961), Marcos (1965, 1969, 1981), Ramos (1992) and Aquino III (2010). Presidents Estrada and Arroyo only delivered their inaugural addresses there. To date, Estrada and Arroyo were the only presidents to take the oath of office and inaugural addresses in two different locations.

Other presidents, namely Aguinaldo and Estrada, were inaugurated at the Barasoain Church in Malolos, Bulacan; Quezon, Laurel and Roxas were inaugurated in front of the Legislative Building; and Aquino in Club Filipino, Greenhills, San Juan, Metro Manila. Marcos was inaugurated in Maharlika Hall, Malacañang Palace in 1986, and Duterte was inaugurated in the Rizal Hall, Malacañang Palace in 2016. Arroyo took her first oath as president at the EDSA Shrine in Quezon City. Osmeña, who assumed the presidency upon the death of his predecessor Manuel L. Quezon, took his oath of office in Washington D.C. Quirino and Garcia took their first oath of office in the Quirino Council of State Room of the Malacañang Palace following the death of their predecessors.

Attendees
In addition to the general public, the following are the attendants of the inauguration:
 The president and vice president elect and their immediate families.
 Members of Congress.
 Members of the President's Cabinet.
 The Chief Justice and Associate Justices of the Supreme Court.
 Local officials
 Representatives of different civil organizations.
 Members of the Diplomatic Corps.
 Usually the outgoing president and vice-president.
 Choir, orchestra, and other musical performers.
 Representatives of the various religions of the country.
 Security and uniformed personnel headed by the Presidential Security Group and the Philippine National Police.
 Military band, honor guard, and the uniformed personnel from the Armed Forces of the Philippines.

If a civil-military parade follows the speech the format is the same as in the Independence Day parades, with the AFP first, with the units of the Philippine National Police, Bureau of Fire Protection and the Philippine Coast Guard following them and later by civilian marchers representing the government, private sector, youth and youth uniformed organizations, national athletes and the representatives of the nation's religious sector and its various ethnic nationalities.

Ceremonial

Oath of office

Under Article VII, Section 5 of the 1987 Constitution, before the president and vice-president can

The oath from the Filipino version of the Constitution was used for the inaugurations of Presidents Fidel V. Ramos, Joseph Estrada, Benigno Aquino III, and Bongbong Marcos:

Inaugural address

Every president since Emilio Aguinaldo delivered an inaugural address. Presidents, who became president upon the death of their predecessor, also delivered an address. It is usually delivered after the new president took the oath of office. However, President Gloria Macapagal Arroyo delivered the inaugural address first at the Quirino Grandstand and then took the oath of office in Cebu.

Gallery

List of inaugural ceremonies
Note: Vice presidents-elect usually take the oath of office with the president-elect, but Rodrigo Duterte broke tradition by requesting then Vice President-elect Leni Robredo to hold inauguration rites separately. The only other instance that the vice president was inaugurated separately was when Gloria Macapagal Arroyo succeeded to the presidency and nominated Teofisto Guingona as vice president. Guingona was confirmed by Congress on February 9, 2001, and took the oath of office the same day.

References

External links
 Philippine Presidential Inaugurations on the Official Gazette
 The Protocol, Ceremony, History and Symbolism of the Presidential Inauguration on the Presidential Museum and Library
 Inauguration of President Aquino and past Philippine Presidents